The Belgian Masters was a non-ranking snooker tournament staged between 1990 and 1992, then revived for a single event in 1996. John Parrott won the inaugural tournament in 1990, with Mike Hallett winning the 1991 edition and James Wattana victorious in 1992. Matthew Stevens won the final tournament, which was revived for one year, in 1996.

Winners

References

Belgian Masters
Snooker non-ranking competitions
Recurring sporting events established in 1990
Recurring events disestablished in 1996
Defunct snooker competitions